Outrageous Fortune is a New Zealand comedy-drama television series, revolving around the West family. The series was created by James Griffin and Rachel Lang. The series premiered on 12 July 2005 featuring an ensemble cast, which has included: Robyn Malcolm, Grant Bowler, Antony Starr, Siobhan Marshall, Antonia Prebble, Frank Whitten and Kirk Torrance.

Overview
Color key:

Notes

Main cast and characters

Cheryl West 

Cheryl West (Robyn Malcolm) is married to Wolfgang West, and in her early or mid forties. She is the mother of Van, Jethro, Pascalle and Loretta, and later becomes the grandmother and adoptive guardian of Jane. After Wolf is sent to prison early in series 1, Cheryl decides that she and the rest of the family will 'go straight'. After several short term stints working for other people, she and her friend Kasey start the Hoochie Mama lingerie firm. Cheryl runs the business until series 5, when she hands it over to Jethro. During series 1 she enters into a relationship with Wayne Judd, who at that time is a police detective. The relationship is initially secret, but Cheryl later leaves Wolf for Judd. She falls pregnant with Judd's child in series 4, but the baby is stillborn. At the end of series 5, Cheryl accidentally stabs D.S. Zane Gerard with a broken bottle as he arrests Pascalle. Gerard dies from his injuries and Cheryl is charged with murder and jailed. While she is in prison, Judd breaks up with her because he has fallen in love with Pascalle. In the second to last episode, Cheryl walks free after the police drop the murder charges, due to Gerard's dodgy past.

Wolfgang West 
Wolfgang "Wolf" West (Grant Bowler) is a career criminal in his forties, and is married to Cheryl West when the show begins. Wolf has four children with her: Jethro, Van, Pascalle, and Loretta. He also has an illegitimate teenage son, whom Pascalle slept with during her promiscuous years, and a deceased infant daughter with Cheryl. At the start of series 1 he is sentenced to prison for four years, provoking Cheryl into trying to turn the family away from crime. In series 2 he is released on home detention after Jethro finds evidence that Judd had planted some evidence. Wolf walked out on his family halfway through series 2 due to Cheryl's affair with Judd, plus the fallout from the robbery of some motorbike gangs, but ended up coming back at the end of series 3. At the end of series 3 and during series 4 he had a relationship with Sheree Greegan, but at the end of series 4 he dumps her to go back to Cheryl, who rejects him. He leaves the country and in series 6 is revealed to be in Australia with his brother, Gary Savage. Throughout the show he opposes Cheryl's plan for the family to 'go straight' and repeatedly tries to get his sons (but not his daughters) involved in his criminal enterprises. All the West children look up to Wolf to some extent, although less so as the show progresses.

Van West 
Van West (Antony Starr) is the twin brother of Jethro West, and is approximately 21 when the show begins. He is of below-average intelligence, which his family attribute to his being trapped in a freezer during a childhood game of hide and seek. Despite his simple ways, Van is shown to be very caring and fiercely loyal to those whom he loves. He is best friends with Munter, and the two start Tool Guys, a handyman business, together. He is also Munter's best man at his wedding to Kasey. In series 1 Van gets engaged to Draska Doslic, but she changes her mind and runs away from the wedding. In series 2 he reunites with his childhood sweetheart Aurora Bay and they become engaged, but she is then killed in a motorbike accident. Van becomes extremely depressed and gets back together with Draska, who fakes a pregnancy in order to keep him. He later dates his father's ex-girlfriend Sheree Greegan, until she attempts to kill him by staging a house fire, and leaves the country. He believes himself to be the father of her twins. In series 6 he falls in love, and in the final marries, Elena, a Russian girl he met while doing a course at Unitec.

Jethro West 
Jethro West (Antony Starr) is the twin brother of Van West, and is approximately 21 at when the show begins. Unlike his twin, he is highly intelligent and also very unscrupulous. In the first episode he graduates from law school, and he works as a lawyer for several series', first for a large firm and then on his own. Subsequently, he embarks on various entrepreneurial schemes, often of dubious morality and legality. These include legal party pills, property development, and Hoochie Mama, the lingerie firm originally owned by his mother. He has had a series of one-night stands and relationships, several of them with women who his brother has also been involved with. He is probably also the biological father of Sheree's twins. Early in the show, Cheryl is particularly proud of Jethro as she believes he has rejected his father's criminal ways. However she is heartbroken when it is revealed that in fact Jethro has only become a lawyer in order to be a more effective criminal.

Pascalle West 
Pascalle West (Siobhan Marshall) is Cheryl and Wolf West's oldest daughter. Pascalle is 17 when the show begins. In series 1 her ambition is to become a model like her hero Rachel Hunter. She manages to get some modelling work and also a degree of fame after having an affair with a local celebrity. In series 2 she is sentenced to community service at a retirement home after being caught shoplifting. The experience of looking after the elderly makes her less shallow and gives her a positive new age philosophy. While at the retirement home, she meets and becomes engaged to Dr. Bruce Khan. She tells him she is a virgin, when in fact she has been quite promiscuous. She agrees to star in a pornographic movie directed by Loretta in order to raise money to have hymen restoration surgery. However Bruce sees the movie (which has been edited to be more graphic than Pascalle wanted) and he dumps her. She then makes a series of internet videos about positive thinking, which are seen by American millionaire Milt Delaney, who she marries. Early in series 4 Milt has a heart attack and dies, making Pascalle a rich widow. She uses the money to start up a company selling 'the best bag ever'. The money attracts Loretta's boyfriend Nicky Greegan, who dumps Loretta for Pascalle. They become engaged, but Pascalle dumps Nicky after his sister Sheree defrauds Pascalle's company, putting her out of business. Pascalle becomes involved with Nicky's nemesis, D.S. Zane Gerard. After Nicky confesses to bank robbery in order to free Ted, Pascalle takes him back. Gerard begins harassing Pascalle and her family. At the end of series 5, this culminates in a raid on the West house in which Cheryl stabs Gerard and Gerard shoots Pascalle. Nicky escapes from prison and tries to persuade Pascalle to elope with him, but after an armed stand-off she refuses. Later in series 6 she falls in love with Judd and the two start an affair. At the end of the final series she leaves to be with him.

Loretta West 
Loretta West (Antonia Prebble) is the youngest daughter of Cheryl and Wolf West. Approximately 15 when the series begins She is very cynical and has no obvious moral compass until the final series. Her lack of morality is shown in acts such as allowing her best friend Kurt to be arrested for DVD piracy which she had in fact committed (against his protests), and her attempts to sell her daughter Jane. Jane was the result of an accidental pregnancy which Loretta was unaware of until it was too late for her to have an abortion. Cheryl adopted Jane after foiling Loretta's attempts to sell her, but Loretta and Jane's father Hayden subsequently took on shared parenting. While Cheryl was in prison in series 6, Loretta and Hayden were Jane's primary caregivers, and the experience of motherhood seems to have softened and humanised Loretta, making her generally more considerate of others. Loretta owns or runs a string of small businesses over the course of the show, including a video store, a cleaning company, the Tool Guys, a legal party pill business, and a brothel. Towards the end of the series it is suggested that she has become like Cheryl.

Theodore West 
Theodore "Ted" West (Frank Whitten) is Wolf's elderly father, but in series 3 it is revealed that Wolf's mother Rita had cheated on him and Wolf might not be his son. Ted continues to live with the Wests after the revelation, and even after Wolf disappears from the picture, partly because Ted owns the house they all live in. Ted is a skilled safe cracker, and although mostly retired he still occasionally does 'jobs' for friends and family. Although he is a career criminal, Ted has a very strict moral code, which puts loyalty to family and friends above everything else, and forbids informing on anyone or pleading guilty to anything. He initially hated Judd, partly because Judd was a police officer but also because of Judd's involvement with Cheryl and Wolf's marriage breakup. However, when Wolf found a new partner (Sheree), Ted felt Wolf had betrayed the family and subsequently bonded with Judd. Ted then worked for Judd's security firm. When Judd fell in love with Pascalle, Ted began hating him again. In the first two series' it was believed that Ted had Alzheimer's disease, but this was then revealed to be a brain tumor, which was surgically removed. In series 4 Ted marries Ngaire Munroe, the widow of one of Ted's old criminal associates, Lefty.

Wayne Judd 
Wayne Judd (Kirk Torrance) (recurring series' 1–4) was initially a Detective Sergeant in the police force and primary antagonist of the show, who regularly investigated crimes in which the West family were suspected of involvement. He is in his forties. He fell in love with Cheryl in series 1, and ended up leaving the police force due to that. By series 3 they were partners. After leaving the police he worked as a private investigator in his own firm. Cheryl gave birth to his baby in series 5, only to have it die at birth. This and Cheryl's imprisonment in series 6 caused their relationship to suffer, and Judd fell in love with Pascalle. In the series final, they leave to be together for good.

Recurring and notable cast and characters

Eric Grady 
Eric Grady (Brian Sergent) is a long-time friend of the West family and one of Wolf's partners in crime. He is extremely sleazy and persistently attempts to sleep with Cheryl. He disappeared into hiding after series 2, due to Judd's ex-wife and cop Monica lying to him that she had told everyone he was a nark. He returned in series 5, and revealed that he had been hiding in Palmerston North, until he had come across Monica again there, who told him the truth to get back at Wayne and the Wests. In series 6 he becomes Van's flatmate.

Jared Mason 
Jared "Munter" Mason (Tammy Davis) is Van West's best friend, and the husband of Kasey. Munter has been considered as part of the West family since primary school. Most of the West children refer to him as their half-brother, while Cheryl considers him as one of her children. He is a Tool Guy with Van, and helped him to start up the business. He was thought to be infertile for a short period, but Kasey since became pregnant and gave birth to their son, Hemi, in series 6.

Caroline Darling 
Caroline Darling (Katrina Browne) is a teacher at Shadbolt High School, where she had a relationship with Jethro while he was still her student. Loretta found out about this and blackmailed her into allowing her to wag school. Caroline and Jethro's relationship continued into series 2.

Glen Hickey 
Glen Hickey (Rohan Glynn) is detective who was obsessed with, and could not stop stalking Pascalle West.

Kurt 
Kurt (Dane Dawson) is Loretta West's best friend, She allowed him to be arrested for DVD piracy, which she had in fact committed.

Tracy Hong 
Tracy Hong (Michelle Ang) was a love interest for both Van and Jethro West, and daughter of Mr. Hong. Bought into Hoochie Mama, then left town after seeing her boyfriend Jethro hit his mother Cheryl.

Mr. Hong 
Mr. Hong (Trevor Sai Louie) was Van's employer at Lucky Dollar, after Van robbed his house.

Franklin Corke 
Franklin "Corky" Corke (Jason Hoyte) Wolf's lawyer.

Suzy Hong 
Suzy Hong (Josephine Davison) is one of Van West's many lovers, she has an affair with him while he is working for her husband. Van fathers their daughter, Jasmine, though Mr. Hong believes the baby to be his own.

Draska Doslic 
Draska Doslic (Aidee Walker) was Pascalle's best friend, and become Van's fiancée. In the series 1 final, she changes her mind about the marriage and runs off, partly because Loretta bribes her to leave. After Aurora's death, Draska returns and she and Van get back together. She fakes a pregnancy in order to keep him, but Cheryl and Munter expose her. She reappears in series 6 as one of Cheryl's fellow inmates. The two initially come into conflict but then become cellmates and friends.

Rochelle Stephens 
Rochelle Stephens (Roz Turnbull) is Cheryl and Kasey's best friend, and has 2 children with Lloyd.

Barry Gibbs 
Barry "Sparky" Gibbs (John Leigh) is and electrician, pyromaniac and associate of the West family, who sporadically turns up - usually to cause trouble. He is an old friend of Wolf's, and trusts him implicitly. In series 5 he is sent to prison for kidnapping, eventually breaking out. In series 6 he returns as a "reformed" parking warden forced to join Ted's "crew".

Falani 
Falani (David Fane) is a Samoan friend of the Wests and one of Wolf's partners in crime, with his specialty being the fencing of stolen goods. He lives in fear of his never-seen wife, known only as Mrs. Falani.

Kasey Mason 
Kasey Mason (Nicole Whippy) is of the original owners of the lingerie business, Hoochie Mama, and the wife of Munter. She briefly dated Dane Harris after Munter and her separated, because they cheated on one another. However they got back together and Kasey became pregnant with their first child, even though Munter was previously thought to be infertile. Had a lesbian affair with an Inland Revenue inspector to try to keep her off Hoochie's case, after they staged a number of invisible parties to launder money through the business. In series 6 she and Munter welcomed a son, Hemi. She currently works for Hoochie Mama again and their new debt collecting company "Booty Call".

Monica Judd 
Monica Judd (Kate Louise Elliott) is Wayne's ex-wife. A detective who hates the West family, due to Wayne's involvement with Cheryl. Moves down to Palmerston North.

Hayden Peters 
Hayden Peters (Shane Cortese) previously dated Pascalle for a short period, before moving on to Loretta. The relationship with Loretta ended over the pornography movie they made together and Hayden moved to Australia, after she burned down his house. He returned towards the end of series 4 to start being a father figure to his daughter Jane, whom Loretta gave birth to in the series 3 final. He is in the party pill business with Jethro, and marries Loretta in the series 5 final, supposedly so that they could fairly fight for shared custody of their daughter Jane. In series 6 he reveals that he is broke. He starts up a business with Ted and Ngaire and then begins working with Loretta to run her prostitutes at a brothel named Loretta's.

Lloyd Draper 
Lloyd Draper (Scott Harding) a bank manager who tried and failed to lend money to various members of the West family. He later became a marriage celebrant and officiated most of the show's weddings. In series 4 he began a relationship with Cheryl and Kasey's good friend and business partner, Rochelle Stephens, and also left his bank after it was robbed by Loretta and Nicky. He then started a microgreens company funded by a loan from Pascalle.

Jools 
Jools (Holly Shanahan)

Aurora Bay 
Aurora Bay (Claire Chitham) was Van's high-school sweetheart, but she disappeared from his life after Jethro pretended to be Van in order to sleep with her. In series 2 she reappears as the girlfriend of a gang member. Van rescues her and the two become engaged, but she is tragically killed in a motorbike accident before their wedding.

Tyson 
Tyson (Ben Barrington) is a gang member and was Aurora Bay's boyfriend.

Dr. Bruce Khan 
Dr. Bruce Khan (Jacob Rajan)

Graeme Harkness 
Ranger Graeme Harkness (Nick Kemplen) first appears in the Christmas television film. He looks after the Tutaekuri Bay camping area that the Wests stay at each summer and is in constant conflict with them. Loretta develops a crush on him and they have a fling. He reappears in series 5 and he and Loretta have a short-term relationship before she breaks up with him.

Gary Savage 
Gary Savage (Aaron Jeffery) is Wolf's half-brother, from an affair his mother, Rita had with a young neighbour, Vern Gardiner, while Ted was in prison for a botched robbery of department store, Smith & Caughey's. He is a businessman and property developer who employed Jethro as his lawyer. He offered Wolf a business contract for earth moving in diggers. He leaves the country and in series 6 is revealed to be in Australia with his brother, Wolf.

Aaron Spiller 
Aaron Spiller (Wesley Dowdell) went to school with Van, Jethro and Munter. He desperately wants to be Van's mate, and was hired by Loretta to be a Tool Guy with Van and Munter. Has an unhealthy obsession with Pascalle, and in series 5 tries his hardest to protect her from the cops. In series 6 he takes a bullet in the ass to protect Pascalle from Sheree.

The Gooch 
The Gooch (Karl Willetts) Aaron Spiller's best mate, a fellow Tool Guy and the only one with any actual competence in the job.

Ngaire West 
Ngaire West (formerly Munroe) (Elizabeth Hawthorne) first appeared in series 3, as an old associate of Ted's. There was no love lost between them at that point, but in series 4 she reappears in Ted's life and the two fell in love, ending up getting married in the final.

Sheree Greegan 
Sheree Greegan (Tyler-Jane Mitchel) is first seen at the end of series 3, as Wolf's girlfriend. However, after many accounts of flirting and attempts of seduction, she and Van got together after Wolf dumped her. She became pregnant with Jethro's twins, and ended up living at the West's. Left town after stealing Pascalle's money, and sold the twins shortly after their birth. In series 6 she returns when her brother Nicky is about to flee the country to Thailand with his fiancé, Pascalle.

Jane West 
Jane West (Stella King) is Loretta's daughter with Hayden, who was adopted by Cheryl when Loretta chose not to look after her.

Nicky Greegan 
Nicky Greegan (Craig Hall) is Sheree's extremely close younger brother. He was a partner in crime with Wolf, before getting involved with Loretta. The two stage a bank robbery, framing Wolf. With Sheree's encouragement, he then dumps Loretta for Pascalle, because Pascalle is rich and also a nicer person. Pascalle's family tries to break them up, but the two become engaged at the end of series 4. To Sheree's horror, Nicky has fallen in love with Pascalle and is not just after her money. In series 5, Nicky organises a robbery which results in Ted getting arrested. Pascalle finds out and dumps him for Gerard, but after Nicky turns himself in in exchange for Ted's release, she takes him back. In series 6 he escapes and tries to persuade Pascalle to go on the run with her. She nearly does so, but then backs out when she finds out that Sheree is involved. Nicky flees and is probably in South-East Asia with Sheree.

Bilkey van der Heever 
Bilkey van der Heever (Jon Brazier) an old friend of Ted's. Was in the crime business back in the day, and is openly homosexual.

Dane Harris 
Dane Harris (Barnie Duncan) went to school with Van and Munter. Dated Kasey in series 4 while Kasey and Munter were not dating one another anymore. Currently in prison due to amateur robberies of dairies with a scraper. Was Ted's cellmate for a brief period of time.

Zane Gerard 
Detective Sergeant Zane Gerard (Charles Mesure) is a police detective with an unexplained vendetta against Nicky Greegan. In series 5 he harasses Van and Munter in order to turn Van into an informant on Nicky, even though Van doesn't know anything. He enters into a relationship with Pascalle, who then dumps him to go back to Nicky. In revenge, Gerard stages a raid on the West house and begins to drag Pascalle away. In the series cliffhanger, Cheryl accidentally stabs him with a broken bottle and he fires his gun at her, hitting Pascalle. At the start of series 6 he dies from his injuries and Cheryl is charged with murder. During the series information emerges that Gerard had a history of harassing women and using his police powers inappropriately. In order to avoid this being revealed, the police agree to drop the charges against Cheryl.

Nadine Kronk 
Nadine Kronk (Sarah Walden) was Jethro's best friend at Shadbolt High School. She started the party pill business with Jethro, Hayden, and Loretta  and later goes to rehab.

Angel 
Angel (Hori Ahipene) is a shemale call girl, formerly known as Garth Loader. Several years ago Garth married Sheree Greegan and faked his own death in order to get a life insurance payout. He then moved to Australia and became Angel. She first appears on the show in series 5, working for Nicky Greegan's escort agency. After Nicky is imprisoned she begins working for Loretta and Hayden. She also shares a house with Van for a while and has some kind of relationship with Eric.

Deleesha Judd 
Deleesha Judd (Dominique Crawford) is Wayne's half sister, who lived with the Wests for a short period of time. She's in a relationship with Isaac Anesi.

Bailey Wilson 
Bailey Wilson (Sophie Henderson) is Van's lawyer. She managed to get Munter, Pascalle, Falani, Ngaire, Ted and Eric off their charges from the series 5 final. She had a brief fling with Van but he could not handle sharing Bailey with Jethro. She is dating Jethro. Bailey got Cheryl off on her murder charge in the second to last episode.

Guest stars

References

Lists of comedy television characters
Lists of drama television characters
Lists of New Zealand television series characters